The Silver Condor Award for Best Actor , given by the Argentine Film Critics Association, awards the best actor in Argentina each year:

 
Argentine Film Critics Association